Ozaawindib may refer to:

 Ozaawindib, a 19th-century Ojibwa warrior 
 Ozaawindib (Chippewa chief), 19th century Ojibwa chief for the Prairie Rice Lake Band of Lake Superior Chippewa Indians
 Ozaawindib (Mille Lacs chief), chief of the Mille Lacs Indians
Jacob Fahlström, the first Swede to settle in Minnesota, called Ozaawindib by the Ojibwe for his blond hair